Natalia Carolina Verbeke Leiva (born 23 February 1975) is an Argentinian-Spanish actress. She gained notoriety for her performance in The Other Side of the Bed.

Biography 
Natalia Verbeke was born on 23 February 1975 in Buenos Aires. At age 11, she moved to Madrid to join her parents, Argentine emigrants to Spain. She completed her secondary education at the Beatriz Galindo high school in the Madrilenian district of Salamanca. She trained her acting chops at Real Escuela Superior de Arte Dramático (RESAD) and at Escuela Guindalera under .

Verbeke made her debut performance in a feature film in Un buen novio (1998), in which she starred alongside Fernando Guillén Cuervo. It was followed by roles in films such as Nobody Knows Anybody, Son of the Bride, and The Other Side of the Bed, the latter of which earned Verbeke wide popularity.

She received two Ondas Awards for the latter two films. In 2005, she starred as María in A golpes. In 2011 she featured in French film The Women on the 6th Floor with Fabrice Luchini and Sandrine Kiberlain.

Onstage, Verbeke has performed in a production of A Midsummer Night's Dream in England. On television, she has starred in El pantano (The Reservoir), Al filo de la ley (At the Edge of the Law), and Los Serrano (The Serranos).

She has had one daughter from her relationship with rugby player Marcos Poggi.

Filmography

Film

Television

Accolades

References

Further reading

External links
 

Actresses from Buenos Aires
Argentine people of Belgian descent
Argentine emigrants to Spain
Spanish people of Flemish descent
Living people
1975 births
20th-century Spanish actresses
21st-century Spanish actresses
Spanish television actresses
Spanish film actresses